Pavel Leonidivuch Chumachenko (Cyrillic: Павел Леонидович Чумаченко; born 5 April 1971 in Bratsk) is a Russian shot putter.

His personal best is 20.54 metres, achieved in June 2001 in Bremen. He has an indoor personal best of 20.91 metres.

International competitions

References

External links

1971 births
Living people
People from Bratsk
Sportspeople from Irkutsk Oblast
Russian male shot putters
Olympic male shot putters
Olympic athletes of Russia
Athletes (track and field) at the 2000 Summer Olympics
Athletes (track and field) at the 2004 Summer Olympics
Competitors at the 1998 Goodwill Games
Competitors at the 2001 Goodwill Games
World Athletics Championships athletes for Russia
Russian Athletics Championships winners